Sir Robert Killigrew (1580–1633) was an English courtier and politician who sat in the House of Commons at various times between 1601 and 1629. He served as Ambassador to the United Provinces.

Life
Killgrew was born at Lothbury, London, the son of William Killigrew and his wife Margery (Mary) Saunders, daughter of Thomas Saunders of Uxbridge, Middlesex. In January 1591, he matriculated at Christ Church, Oxford at the age of 11. He travelled abroad in 1596 and may have become an official of the Privy Chamber in 1601. He was elected MP for St Mawes in 1601.

Killigrew was knighted by King James I in 1603. In 1604 he was elected MP for Newport. It is possible that he travelled to Jamestown in 1604. His name appears in the Second Charter of Virginia as a backer. In 1606 he was appointed ambassador to the United Provinces.

In June 1612, Killigrew was noted as "one of Carr's favourites" according to John Chamberlain. The following May, he was committed to the Fleet Prison for an unknown offence. Having become famous for his concoctions of drugs and cordials, he was at first suspected of complicity in the death of Sir Thomas Overbury in September 1613, but was subsequently officially exonerated.

In 1614, Killigrew was elected MP for Helston. On 12 May that year, he was involved in an altercation in the House of Commons. In July, he was appointed Keeper of Pendennis Castle, Falmouth, and a JP that same year. He is recorded as fighting a duel with Captain Burton in 1618. In October that year he was appointed an Officer of Protonotary of Chancery, and in December the following year was mentioned favourably by Buckingham.

In 1621, Killigrew was elected again MP for Newport. In 1622 he succeeded his father to become farmer of the profits from seals in King's bench and common pleas which was worth at least £560 a year. He was elected MP for Penryn and was appointed Deputy Lieutenant for Cornwall in 1624. In 1625 he was elected MP for Cornwall. He was also appointed Ambassador to the United Provinces in September 1625, but this was not taken up by December that year. In 1626, he was elected MP for Tregony in 1626. In 1628 he was elected MP for Bodmin and sat until 1629 when King Charles decided to rule without parliament for eleven years. He was appointed Vice-Chamberlain to Queen Henrietta Maria in 1630.

Killigrew was a knight of Arwenack in Falmouth, Cornwall. He died a wealthy man in 1633 in Bath, Somerset, with the probate of his will on 12 May.

Family
He married Mary Woodhouse of Kimberley, Norfolk, (1584–1656), and they had several notable children:
William Killigrew (1606–1695)
Anne Killigrew (1607–1641), who married George Kirke
Robert Killigrew (1611-1???)
Thomas Killigrew (1612–1683)
Henry Killigrew (1613–1700)
Elizabeth Killigrew (1615-1619)
Catherine Killigrew (1618–1689), wife of Sir Thomas Stanley
Elizabeth Killigrew (1622–1681), wife of Francis Boyle, 1st Viscount Shannon, was a mistress of Charles II and bore him a daughter
Mary Killigrew (1623–1677), later wife of Sir John James, she has been confused in other biographies with Mary Sackville (1645–1679) (formerly Berkeley, née Bagot)--the widowed Countess of Falmouth—who was another mistress

Mary, his widow, married Sir Thomas Stafford after 1633. She was a correspondent of Constantijn Huygens.

References

1580 births
1633 deaths
People from Falmouth, Cornwall
Alumni of Christ Church, Oxford
Ambassadors of England to the Netherlands
17th-century diplomats
Members of the pre-1707 English Parliament for constituencies in Cornwall
English justices of the peace
English MPs 1601
English MPs 1604–1611
English MPs 1614
English MPs 1621–1622
English MPs 1624–1625
English MPs 1625
English MPs 1626
English MPs 1628–1629
Inmates of Fleet Prison
Deputy Lieutenants of Cornwall
Robert
Knights Bachelor